Cuapetes andamanensis is a species of shrimp found in the Pacific and Indian Oceans. It was first named by Kemp in 1922.

References

Palaemonoidea
Crustaceans described in 1922